Abraham Drake (December 4, 1715 – August 1, 1781) was an officer in the New Hampshire militia that served with the Continental Army during the American Revolutionary War.

Biography

Drake was born in Hampton, New Hampshire to Abraham Drake and his wife, Theodate Roby. Abraham Drake married Abigail Weare, the sister of future New Hampshire "president" Meshech Weare, on January 13, 1738. They had two children before her death in 1740. On November 25, 1742, Abraham Drake remarried to Abigail Dearborn and together they would have thirteen children.

During the French and Indian War, he served as a lieutenant and, later, as a captain in the Dragoon company of Maj. Tash's battalion of the New Hampshire Provincial Regiment.

With the start of the American Revolutionary War in 1775 and 1776, Abraham Drake was Lt. Col. in Jonathan Moulton's 3rd New Hampshire Militia Regiment that guarded the New Hampshire seacoast from British attack. In 1777, he was promoted to colonel of the 2nd New Hampshire Militia Regiment and commanded them during the Saratoga Campaign, serving in Ebenezer Learned's brigade.

Later, he served as a delegate to the New Hampshire Provincial Congress.  Col. Abraham Drake died on August 1, 1781.

References
State Builders: An Illustrated Historical and Biographical Record of the State of New Hampshire. State Builders Publishing Manchester, NH 1903

1715 births
1781 deaths
People of colonial New Hampshire
People of New Hampshire in the French and Indian War
New Hampshire militiamen in the American Revolution
People of New Hampshire in the American Revolution
People from Hampton, New Hampshire